Ilias Ali (born 1955) is a surgeon from Assam, India. In 2019, Ali was conferred the Padma Shri civilian honour by the President of India, Ram Nath Kovind, for his contribution towards raising awareness about family planning and birth control measures in the backward areas of Assam.

Career 
He is a retired medical surgeon from the Guwahati Medical College and Hospital. He founded the Emergency Medicine department at the Gauhati Medical College and Hospital.

Social work 
Since 1993, Ali has been championing the cause of family planning and the necessity to adopt birth control measures in the backward areas of Assam, especially within the Bengali Muslim settlements where the use of contraceptives is prominently considered to be non-Islamic in nature. He encourages the people to undergo the No Scalpel Vasectomy (NSV) and despite strong resistance, he has motivated around 55,000 people to undergo the NSV process between 2008 and 2018. Ali has also spoken out against child marriage and polygamy.

Books 

 Kuri Satikar Mahabyadhi - AIDS
 Jana Bisfuranar Pom Khedi

References 

Indian surgeons
Recipients of the Padma Shri in medicine
1956 births
Living people